A frugivore is an animal that thrives mostly on raw fruits or succulent fruit-like produce of plants such as roots, shoots, nuts and seeds. Approximately 20% of mammalian herbivores eat fruit. Frugivores are highly dependent on the abundance and nutritional composition of fruits. Frugivores can benefit or hinder fruit-producing plants by either dispersing or destroying their seeds through digestion. When both the fruit-producing plant and the frugivore benefit by fruit-eating behavior the interaction is a form of mutualism.

Frugivore seed dispersal
Seed dispersal is important for plants because it allows their progeny to move away from their parents over time. The advantages of seed dispersal may have led to the evolution of fleshy fruits, which entice animals to consume them and move the plant's seeds from place to place. While many fruit-producing plant species would not disperse far without frugivores, their seeds can usually germinate even if they fall to the ground directly below their parent.

Many types of animals are seed dispersers. Mammal and bird species represent the majority of seed-dispersing species. However, frugivorous tortoises, lizards, amphibians, and even fish also disperse seeds. For example, cassowaries are a keystone species because they spread fruit through digestion, many of the seeds of which will not grow unless they have been digested by the animal. While frugivores and fruit-producing plant species are present worldwide, there is some evidence that tropical forests have more frugivore seed dispersers than the temperate zones.

Ecological significance
Frugivore seed dispersal is a common phenomenon in many ecosystems. However, it is not a highly specific type of plant–animal interaction. For example, a single species of frugivorous bird may disperse fruits from several species of plants, or a few species of bird may disperse seeds of one plant species. This lack of specialization could be because fruit availability varies by season and year, which tends to discourage frugivore animals from focusing on just one plant species. Furthermore, different seed dispersers tend to disperse seeds to different habitats, at different abundances, and distances, depending on their behavior and numbers.

Plant adaptations to attract dispersers
There are a number of fruit characteristics that seem to be adaptive characteristics to attract frugivores. Animal-dispersed fruits may advertise their palatability to animals with bright colors  and attractive smells (mimetic fruits). Fruit pulp is generally rich in water and carbohydrates and low in protein and lipids. However, the exact nutritional composition of fruits varies widely. The seeds of animal-dispersed fruits are often adapted to survive digestion by frugivores. For example, seeds can become more permeable to water after passage through an animal's gut. This leads to higher germination rates. Some mistletoe seeds even germinate inside the disperser's intestine.

Frugivore adaptations for fruit consumption
Many seed-dispersing animals have specialized digestive systems to process fruits, which leave seeds intact. Some bird species have shorter intestines to rapidly pass seeds from fruits, while some frugivorous bat species have longer intestines. Some seed-dispersing frugivores have short gut-retention times, and others can alter intestinal enzyme composition when eating different types of fruits.

Plant mechanisms to delay or deter frugivory

Since plants invest considerable energy into fruit production, many have evolved to encourage mutualist frugivores to consume their fruit for seed dispersal. Some have also evolved mechanisms to decrease consumption of fruits when unripe and from non-seed-dispersing predators. Predators and parasites of fruit include seed predators, insects, and microbial frugivores.

Plants have developed both chemical and physical adaptations:

Physical deterrents:
Cryptic coloration (e.g. green fruits blend in with the plant leaves)
Unpalatable textures (e.g. thick skins made of anti-nutritive substances)
Resins and saps (e.g. prevent animals from swallowing)
Repellent substances, hard outer coats, spines, thorns

Chemical deterrents:
Chemical deterrents in plants are called secondary metabolites. Secondary metabolites are compounds produced by the plant that are not essential for the primary processes, such as growth and reproduction. Toxins might have evolved to prevent consumption by animals that disperse seeds into unsuitable habitats, to prevent too many fruits from being eaten per feeding bout by preventing too many seeds being deposited in one site, or to prevent digestion of the seeds in the gut of the animal. Secondary chemical defenses are divided into three categories: nitrogen-based, carbon-based terpenes, and carbon-based phenolics.

Examples of secondary chemical defenses in fruit:
Capsaicin is a carbon-based phenolic compound only found in plant genus Capsicum (chili and bell peppers). Capsaicin is responsible for the pungent, hot "flavor" of peppers and inhibits growth of microbes and invertebrates.
Cyanogenic glycosides are nitrogen-based compounds and are found in 130 plant families, but not necessarily in the fruit of all the plants. It is specifically found in the red berries of the genus Ilex (holly, an evergreen woody plant). It can inhibit electron transport, cellular respiration, induce vomiting, diarrhea, and mild narcosis in animals.
Emodin is a carbon-based phenolic compound in plants like rhubarb. Emodin can be cathartic or act as a laxative in humans, kills dipteran larvae, inhibits growth of bacteria and fungi, and deters consumption by birds and mice.
 Starch is a polysaccharide that is slowly converted to fructose as the fruit ripens.

Frugivorous animals

Avian species 
Birds are a main focus of frugivory research. An article by Bette A. Loiselle and John G. Blake, "Potential Consequences of Extinction of Frugivorous Birds for Shrubs of a Tropical Wet Forest", discusses the important role frugivorous birds have on ecosystems. The conclusions of their research indicate how the extinction of seed-dispersing species could negatively affect seed removal, seed viability, and plant establishment. The article highlights the importance that seed-dispersing birds have on the deposition of plant species.

Examples of seed-dispersing birds are the hornbill, the toucan, the aracari, the cotinga (ex. Guianan cock-of-the-rock), and some species of parrots. Frugivores are common in the temperate zone, but mostly found in the tropics. Many frugivorous birds feed mainly on fruits until nesting season, when they incorporate protein-rich insects into their diet. Facultatively-baccivorous birds may also eat bitter berries, such as juniper, in months when alternative foods are scarce. In North America, red mulberry (Morus rubra) fruits are widely sought after by birds in spring and early summer; as many as 31 species of birds were recorded visiting a fruiting tree in Arkansas.

Prior to 1980, most reports of avian frugivory were made in the tropics. From 1979–1981, a number of studies recognized the importance of fruits to fall temperate assemblages of passerine migrants. The earliest of these field studies were conducted in the fall of 1974 in upstate New York by Robert Rybczynski & Donald K. Riker and separately by John W. Baird in New Jersey, each documenting ingestion of fruits in stands of fruit-bearing shrubs by mixed species assemblages dominated by migrant white-throated sparrows.

Mammals 
Mammals are considered frugivorous if the seed is dispersed and able to establish. One example of a mammalian frugivore is the maned wolf, or Chrysocyon brachyurus, which is found in South America. A study by José Carlos Motta-Junior and Karina Martins found that the maned wolf is probably an important seed disperser. The researchers found that 22.5–54.3% of the diet was fruit.

65% of the diet of orangutans consists of fruit. Orangutans primarily eat fruit, along with young leaves, bark, flowers, honey, insects, and vines. One of their preferred foods is the fruit of the durian tree, which tastes somewhat like sweet custard. Orangutans discard the skin, eat the flesh, and spit out the seeds.

Other examples of mammalian frugivores include fruit bats and the gray-bellied night monkey, also known as the owl monkey:
"Owl monkeys are frugivores and supplement their diet with flowers, insects, nectar, and leaves (Wright 1989; 1994). They prefer small, ripe fruit when available and in order to find these, they forage in large-crown trees (larger than ten meters [32.8 ft]) (Wright 1986). Seasonal availability of fruit varies across environments. Aotus species in tropical forests eat more fruit throughout the year because it is more readily available compared to the dry forests where fruit is limited in the dry season and owl monkeys are more dependent on leaves."

Conservation
Since seed dispersal allows plant species to disperse to other areas, the loss of frugivores could change plant communities and lead to the local loss of particular plant species. Since frugivore seed dispersal is so important in the tropics, many researchers have studied the loss of frugivores and related it to changed plant population dynamics. Several studies have noted that even the loss of only large frugivores, such as monkeys, could have a negative effect, since they are responsible for certain types of long-distance seed dispersal that is not seen with other frugivore types, like birds. However, plant species whose seeds are dispersed by animals may be less vulnerable to fragmentation than other plant species. Frugivores can also benefit from the invasion of exotic fruit-producing species and can be vectors of exotic invasion by dispersing non-native seeds. Consequently, anthropogenic habitat loss and change may negatively affect some frugivore species but benefit others.

See also
Consumer-resource systems
Fruit flies
Fruitarianism

References

Further reading

 

Animals by eating behaviors
Herbivory